Pangrč Grm is a settlement in the foothills of the Gorjanci range in the City Municipality of Novo Mesto in southeastern Slovenia. The area is part of the traditional region of Lower Carniola and is now included in the Southeast Slovenia Statistical Region.

The local church, built on the edge of a forest above the village to the south, on the old route over the Gorjanci Hills towards White Carniola, is dedicated to Saint Nicholas and belongs to the Parish of Stopiče. It is an originally 14th-century Romanesque building that was restyled in the Baroque in the 18th century.

References

External links
Pangrč Grm on Geopedia

Populated places in the City Municipality of Novo Mesto